The Scull Historic District encompasses two concrete-block houses at 428 and 432 Conway Boulevard in Conway, Arkansas.  These two houses were built about 1928, using a style of ornamental concrete block that were a fashionable building material during the 1920s.  Both are single-story structures, with hip roofs and four-column porches recessed under the roof.  The houses were probably built by Ferdinand Lawrence Scull, a local manufacturer of the ornamental blocks used in their construction.

The district was listed on the National Register of Historic Places in 2017.

See also
National Register of Historic Places listings in Faulkner County, Arkansas

References

Historic districts on the National Register of Historic Places in Arkansas
American Craftsman architecture in Arkansas
Geography of Faulkner County, Arkansas
Conway, Arkansas